Farim is a town of northern Guinea-Bissau. It sits on the north bank of the Farim/Cacheu River, about 215 km (135 miles) up the river from Cacheu. Population 8,661 (2009 census).

History
Farim was founded about 1641 by the Captain-Major of Cacheu, who recruited lançados from Geba to move to where they would be less vulnerable to attack by African tribes. The name derived from farim, the title of the local Mandinka people's ruler. For their part, the Mandinkas and Soninke called the settlement Tubabodaga ("village of the whites"). It was well-situated as a port, since the river was continuously navigable by sailing vessels from Cacheu.

It became a presídio (garrisoned place) though an order dated 10 November 1696, in reaction to an anticipated attack from nearby Canico. The area remained generally peaceful, and the defenses gradually deteriorated.

It was a base for operations against Oio in 1897 and 1902. Farim started to grow in earnest in the 1910s, with over twenty trading firms based there, and became a vila (town) in 1918.

Farim had become a centro comercial by 1925, and experienced an influx of Lebanese and Syrian merchants, dealing in peanuts and timber. Its economy was hit hard by the independence struggle in the 1960s and 1970s.

Sports
There are several sports clubs (notably football and athletics) in Farim and area, including SC Farim.

Named after
A crater on Mars is named after the town.

References

 Richard Andrew Lobban Jr. and Peter Karibe Mendy, Historical Dictionary of the Republic of Guinea-Bissau, 3rd ed. (Scarecrow Press, 1997 ) pp. 160–163

Oio Region
Populated places in Guinea-Bissau
Sectors of Guinea-Bissau